Vasil Levski Stadium Metro Station is a station on the Sofia Metro in Bulgaria. It was introduced into service on 8 May 2009.  It serves the Vasil Levski National Stadium. The architectural layout was created by architects Kr. Andreev and D. Mushev.

Automatic Platform Screen Door (APSD)
In August 2020, testing of the first automatic Platform screen doors (Rope-type Screen Door) commenced at the Vasil Levski Stadium Metro Station of the Sofia Metro. These safety barriers are intended for greater safety of passengers. Automatic partition doors on the existing Line 1, in addition to the Vasil Levski Stadium Metro Station, are also being built at the Opalchenska Metro Station. By 2022, this RSD system will be implemented at first 12 stations of the Line 1 and Line 2 of the Sofia Metro.

APSD Gallery

Interchange with other public transport
 Tramway service: 10, 12, 18
 City Bus service: 72, 76, 94, 204, 304, 604

References

External links

 360 degrees panorama from inside the station
 Sofia Metropolitan

Sofia Metro stations
Railway stations opened in 2009
2009 establishments in Bulgaria